Bakonja fra Brne is a 1951 Croatian film directed by Fedor Hanžeković. It is based on Simo Matavulj's novel of the same name.

References

External links
 

1951 films
1950s Croatian-language films
Jadran Film films
Films based on Croatian novels
Yugoslav black-and-white films
Yugoslav comedy films
1951 comedy films
Croatian comedy films
Films set in Croatia